Florence Hannah Bacon Marsh (1881-1948) was a British botanist noted for studying the flora of Herefordshire.

References

1881 births
1948 deaths
Women botanists
American women scientists